KXLX (700 AM) is a radio station licensed to Airway Heights, Washington and broadcasting to the Spokane area. The Morgan Murphy Media station broadcasts at 10 kW day/600 W night pattern. KXLX is an affiliate of ESPN Radio and is also the home station of the Eastern Washington Eagles football team.

History
According to Federal Communications Commission (FCC) application and license renewal information, KXLX's license was transferred from KMJY 700 which had been broadcasting from Newport, Washington since 9 June 1986. KMJY was owned and operated by James and Helen Stargel. The call signs for this station before KMJY were KZUN and KTMI. Another Spokane area station used the call sign KZUN from 1955 to 1985 on 630 kHz. This station was licensed to Opportunity, Washington.

The FCC records also show that KXLX began broadcasting on 700 on February 27, 2004. In 2016, an FM translator of KXLX went on air.

External links

Morgan Murphy Media stations
XLI
XLI
ESPN Radio stations
Radio stations established in 1983
1983 establishments in Washington (state)